Mraz or Mráz (Czech/Slovak feminine: Mrázová) is a surname of Czech, Slovak, and Croatian origin. It means "frost" and is cognate to Maroz (Belarusian), Mróz (Polish), and Moroz (Ukrainian and Russian). It may refer to:

People
 Alois Mráz (born 1978), Czech handball player
 Bruno Mráz (born 1993), Slovak ice hockey player
 Franjo Mraz (1910–1981), Croatian artist
 George Mraz (born 1944), Czech jazz bassist
 Gustáv Mráz (born 1934), Slovak footballer
 Ivan Mráz (born 1941), Czechoslovak footballer
 Jason Mraz (born 1977), American singer-songwriter
 Kateřina Mrázová (born 1972), Czech ice dancer
 Kateřina Mrázová (ice hockey) (born 1992), Czech ice hockey player
 Ladislav Mráz (1923–1962), Czech opera singer
 Mike Mraz, American musician
 Patrik Mráz (born 1987), Slovak footballer
 Pavel Mráz (born 1974), Czech canoer
 Peter Mráz (footballer, born 1985), Slovak football defender
 Peter Mráz (footballer, born 1975), Slovak football midfielder
 Samuel Mráz (born 1997), Slovak footballer

Other
Rani Mraz, Yugoslav rock band
Beneš-Mráz, airplane manufacturer
Mráz Sokol, manufactured by Benes
Mráz Skaut, manufactured by Benes

See also
 
 

Slavic-language surnames
Czech-language surnames
Slovak-language surnames